Planodes pseudosatelles is a species of beetle in the family Cerambycidae. It was described by Stephan von Breuning in 1948.

References

pseudosatelles
Beetles described in 1948